There are about 500 Jain families in Hong Kong, who immigrated to Hong Kong later than most other Indian groups. They originate mostly from the Indian states of Rajasthan, Gujarat and other states. Some Jains belong to Hong Kong originally by mixed ancestry and have Asian features. A small group of people who belonged to Hong Kong by ancestry converted to Jainism under the influence of other Jains. Their community grew rapidly during the 1980s. The Jains are most prominent in the diamond trading business. In 1996, members of the community founded a Jain temple, Shree Hong Kong Jain Sangh, in Tsim Sha Tsui.

When the community was small, the Jains did not build separate religious institutions but allied themselves with the Hindus and participated in building ecumenical Hindu temples, with space set aside for their own images within them.

See also

 Jainism in Canada
 Jainism in Europe
 Jainism in Singapore
 Jainism in the United States

References

Citation

Sources 
 

Hong Kong
Hong Kong
Religion in Hong Kong
Jain communities
Hong Kong